Since the late–1980s, Belgian art historian Catherine de Zegher has curated many art exhibitions, including solo and group exhibitions in museums worldwide as well as large-scale perennial exhibitions. Her curatorial work is centred on modern and contemporary art and challenges mainstream models of art and art history that have excluded the role of women in art, currently, she is focussing on the relationship between women's art and ecology and art. From 1988 to 1998, he was the co-founder and director of Kanaal Art Foundation (Kortrijk, Belgium) where she curated exhibitions on emerging international artists with an emphasis on the development of multiculturalism in Europe. Her curatorial work has received international attention and in 2017 de Zegher received the Oscarla award for her role in the art world. Since 2014, de Zegher is a member of the Royal Flemish Academy of Belgium for Science and the Arts.

1988–1998: Kanaal Art Foundation, Courtray

Solo exhibitions

Group exhibition

1992: America, Bride of the Sun

1995: Inside the Visible: An Elliptical Traverse of 20th Century Art, In, Of, and From the Feminine

1997: Mona Hatoum, Ann Veronica Janssens, Gabriel Orozco

1997: 47th Venice Biennale, Belgian Pavilion

1998: Martha Rosler: Positions in the Life World

1999–2006: Drawing Center, New York

Solo exhibitions

Group exhibitions

2007–2009: Art Gallery of Ontario, Toronto

2006: Freeing the Line

2010: Alma Matrix: Shared Traces/Trazos

2011: On Line: Drawing Through the Twentieth Century

2012: 18th Biennale of Sydney

2013: 55th Venice Biennale

2013: 5th Moscow Biennale

2013–2018: Museum of Fine Arts, Ghent

Solo exhibitions

Group exhibitions

References 

Visual arts exhibitions